"" is a duet from Giovanni Paisiello's 1788 opera L'amor contrastato, ossia La molinara, usually known as  (The Miller-Woman). The duet is sung twice in the opera's second act, first by the miller-woman Rachelina (soprano) and Calloandro (tenor) and then by Rachelina and the notary Pistofolo (baritone). The duet is notable as its theme has been used many times as a basis for other musical works, and due to its inclusion in Alessandro Parisotti's 1885 collection , the song has secured a place in classical vocal pedagogy.

Music 
The duet is written in the key of G major with a  time signature. The voices are accompanied by violins, viola and continuo. There is an 8 measure instrumental introduction followed by 20 measures of Rachelina singing the theme. Calloandro repeats these 20 measures with new text before Rachelina joins him for 12 more that repeat half of the theme. The orchestra then concludes the piece with 4 measures. After some recitative, Calloandro leaves the stage and Pistofolo appears. The duet is repeated entirely as before, but this time with Pistofolo (who sings an entirely new set of words) rather than Calloandro. Without ornamentation, the range for each singer covers the interval of a minor seventh (from F#4 to E5 for Rachelina and F#3 to E4 for Calloandro and Pistofolo). The duet would have been ornamented by singers according to the custom of the day.

Influence 
Beethoven composed six variations in G major for piano, WoO 70, in 1795. Other composers that have used the theme include Paganini ("Introduction and variations in G major" for violin, Op. 38, MS 44, 1827), Fernando Sor (Fantasie, Op. 16 for guitar 1823), Friedrich Silcher (flute and piano), Mauro Giuliani (guitar and keyboard), Luigi Legnani (Op. 16 for guitar), Giovanni Bottesini (for double bass), Nicola Antonio Manfroce, Johann Nepomuk Hummel, and Johann Baptist Wanhal. There is also a version by Theobald Boehm (Böhm),  Nel cor più non mi sento, op. 4 for flute & piano.

Lyrics

Arie Antiche 
When Alessandro Parisotti included this work in his collection of Arie Antiche (1885), he created a solo version by including only the first 28 measures of the duet. He also changed the key to F major and added ornaments without preserving the original melody. The song was later included in G. Schirmer's Twenty-Four Italian Songs and Arias. It is in this form that the duet has become familiar to modern audiences. In concert, it is typically repeated with the repeat being more heavily ornamented.

References
Notes

Sources
 Paisiello, Giovanni. L'amor contrastato, oissia La molinara. Manuscript, n.d. (ca. 1813). Ricasoli Collection at the University of Louisville Music Library, Louisville. International Music Score Library Project.
 Paisiello, Giovanni.  (libretto), Antonio Landini (Jolanda, ballet). "La molinara; ossia, L'amor contrastato; dramma giocoso per musica, in due atti, da rappresentarsi nel R.o Teatro alla Scala, la primavera dell'anno 1810". Book, 1810[?]. Milano, Dalla Società Tipografica de' Classici Italiani. Thomas Fischer Rare Book Library, University of Toronto.
 Paisiello, Giovanni. Giuseppe Palomba (libretto). "La Molinara: a comic opera in two acts as represented at the King's Theatre in the Haymarket for the first time, on Saturday, March 8, 1817". Book, 1817[?]. London: W. Winchester and Son.

External links

Interpretations
  sung by Renata Tebaldi, with orchestra, 1973
  sung by Eglise Gutiérrez, with piano accompaniment
  played by Wilhelm Kempff in 1962
  played by Julio Zoppi
  performed by Lorna Anderson, soprano; David McGuinness, piano

Compositions by Giovanni Paisiello
Opera excerpts
Arias in Italian
1788 compositions
Compositions in G major